This is a list of wars involving Malawi.

References

Malawi
Wars

tum:Mndandanda ya mikangano vikacitikira Malaŵi